Mirmi is town located in the western part of Nepal in the Syangja District, near Galang (Nepal). People of Mirmi are very friendly and heartwarming . People of different ethnicities like Brahmin, Magar, Limbu live in Mirmi. It is known for being home for biggest Hydro-Power project in Nepal - Kaligandaki A Hydroelectric Power Station.

References

Populated places in Syangja District
Syangja District